MLS Cup 2022 was the 27th edition of the MLS Cup, the championship match of Major League Soccer (MLS) at the conclusion of the 2022 MLS Cup Playoffs. The soccer match took place on November 5, 2022, at Banc of California Stadium in Los Angeles, California, United States. It was contested by hosts Los Angeles FC and the Philadelphia Union to determine the champion of the 2022 season. Both clubs finished the regular season atop the Supporters' Shield standings, but LAFC earned the title with the wins tiebreaker.

Los Angeles FC won their first MLS Cup title in a penalty shootout following a 3–3 draw in extra time. It tied the record for the highest-scoring final in MLS Cup history and featured the two latest goals to be scored in an MLS Cup Playoffs match, scored in stoppage time by Jack Elliott and Gareth Bale. The shootout ended in a 3–0 shutout for LAFC and their substitute goalkeeper John McCarthy, who made several saves in the shootout and was named the most valuable player (MVP) of the match.

Road to the final

The MLS Cup is the post-season championship of Major League Soccer (MLS), a professional club soccer league in the United States and Canada. The 2022 season was the 27th in MLS history, and was contested by 28 teams organized into the eastern and western conferences. Each team played 34 matches during the regular season from late February to early October, twice against each intra-conference opponent and eight times for inter-conference opposition in an unbalanced schedule. The schedule was adjusted due to the 2022 FIFA World Cup, which begins in late November. The playoffs were contested between the top seven clubs in each conference through four rounds from October to early November. Each round had a single-elimination match hosted by the higher-seeded team; the top team in each conference was also given a bye to the Conference Semifinals.

The finalists, Los Angeles FC (LAFC) and the Philadelphia Union, were both appearing in their first MLS Cup final and finished atop the regular season table. The two teams were tied on points and the Supporters' Shield was decided by the first tiebreaker, total number of wins, of which LAFC had two more than Philadelphia. The two teams met once during the regular season, a 2–2 draw in early May at Banc of California Stadium in Los Angeles; it was the third consecutive draw between the two teams since 2019. LAFC was characterized as having a "star-studded" lineup relying on international talent, while the Union was a "blue-collar alternative" that relied on data-based cost-effective signings and homegrown products.

MLS Cup 2022 was the fourth final to be contested between two regular season winners and the first since the 2003 final, which was also played in the Los Angeles area; it was also the fourth between two first-time finalists. The final was the first since MLS Cup 2014 to not feature either Seattle Sounders FC or the Portland Timbers representing the Western Conference.

Los Angeles FC

Los Angeles FC entered MLS as an expansion team in 2018, becoming the third club based in the Los Angeles area following the folding of Chivas USA a few years prior. Under head coach Bob Bradley, the club won the Supporters' Shield in 2019 and broke the regular season points record. They advanced to the Conference Final in the playoffs but were eliminated by eventual MLS Cup champions Seattle Sounders FC. They finished 7th in the West during the following year's season, which was shortened due to the COVID-19 pandemic, but still qualified for the playoffs. In the first round, LAFC were again eliminated by Seattle. The club went on to finish as runners-up in the 2020 CONCACAF Champions League, but missed the playoffs in 2021.

Steve Cherundolo, former assistant coach and manager of affiliate Las Vegas Lights FC, was hired in January 2022 to replace Bob Bradley as head coach. The move was criticized by fans, citing his inexperience in MLS and coaching record at Las Vegas where he won 6 of 32 matches. During the off-season, LAFC traded with various MLS clubs to acquire new starting talent, including defender Ryan Hollingshead from FC Dallas for Marco Farfan; defender Franco Escobar from Atlanta United FC and midfielder Kellyn Acosta from the Colorado Rapids, both for general allocation money; and forward Ilie Sánchez from free agency. The club also traded with Vancouver Whitecaps FC for goalkeeper Maxime Crépeau, who joined his former manager-turned-assistant coach Marc Dos Santos and free agent signing John McCarthy as his backup to replace a trio of young goalkeepers who had played in 2021.

The club was undefeated in their opening five matches, but lost to crosstown rival LA Galaxy in the first El Tráfico derby of the year. LAFC took first in Western Conference during the streak and kept a narrow lead over Austin FC and the Galaxy through April and May, including a congested stretch of eight matches in 28 days. By the halfway point in the season in late June, the club had amassed a 11–3–3 record, allowing them to be five points ahead of Austin in the Western standings, and had a five-match unbeaten streak which ended with a loss to Vancouver. LAFC made several major signings from European leagues during the summer transfer window, beginning with winger Gareth Bale from Real Madrid and Italian defender Giorgio Chiellini. Both players joined the team in July, having been acquired without transfer fees, and were signed to contracts that fell below the threshold for Designated Players.

With their new signings, LAFC went on a seven-match winning streak that lasted into August and outscored opponents 19–5; they also saw two goals from Bale as a substitute. During the streak, the club widened their leads over the Union and Austin atop the league standings and were on pace to match the points record set in 2021 by the New England Revolution. In August, LAFC transferred former Designated Players Brian Rodríguez and Diego Rossi to foreign clubs to free up cap space to sign Spanish midfielder Cristian Tello and Gabonese striker Denis Bouanga. These moves completed a summer transfer window in which the club spent $10 million and brought its payroll above $19 million. The team earned a playoffs berth on August 20, setting a record for earliest playoffs clinch at 25 matches, but won only one of six of their following matches while playing several teams on the road. LAFC briefly slid to second in the Supporters' Shield race behind the Union in mid-September, but retook the lead and clinched the Shield on the penultimate matchday of the season in Portland. Through the regular season, Cherundolo used 32 different starting lineups and struggled to integrate Bale, who did not play a full match and appeared 12 times.

As the top seed in the Western Conference, LAFC earned a bye directly to the Conference Semifinals, where they hosted crosstown rival LA Galaxy. A goal by Bouanga, who received a through ball in the penalty area from captain Carlos Vela, opened the scoring for LAFC in the 23rd minute. The Galaxy equalized just before halftime through a misplayed header by Eddie Segura that was converted by Samuel Grandsir. Bouanga's second goal of the match, a tap-in from a ground cross sent by Ryan Hollingshead in the 80th minute, restored LAFC's lead for five minutes until a strike by Galaxy substitute Dejan Joveljić for the from outside the penalty area. LAFC won the match 3–2 with a goal in stoppage time by Cristian Arango, who converted a rebounded shot by Bouanga that Jonathan Bond had saved.

The club advanced to play second-seeded Austin FC, who had defeated LAFC twice in the regular season, in the Western Conference Final at Banc of California Stadium. The match's first goal was scored in the 29th minute by Arango, who headed in a corner kick taken by Vela, but Austin goalkeeper Brad Stuver's seven saves kept the score at 1–0 into the second half. A Vela corner kick in the 62nd minute was headed in by Maximiliano Urruti, who had just entered the match as a substitute and scored an own goal. A few minutes later, Sebastien Ibeagha stepped on the foot of Austin FC's Diego Fagúndez in the penalty area, but a penalty kick was not awarded following a video assistant referee review. Kwadwo Opoku added a third goal for LAFC in the 81st minute by collecting an Austin clearance that bounced to him at the top of the penalty area. Bouanga struck in the fifth minute of stoppage time, but his goal was ruled out after Opoku was deemed to be in an offside position during the play, leaving LAFC with a 3–0 victory. The club was the first Supporters' Shield winner since Toronto FC in 2017 to earn an MLS Cup berth.

Philadelphia Union

The Philadelphia Union entered MLS as an expansion team in 2010 and earned their first playoffs berth in their second season, where they were eliminated in the Conference Semifinals. The club then failed to qualify for the playoffs in the following four seasons, but returned in 2016 under head coach Jim Curtin—their third manager in three years. They also finished as runners-up in the U.S. Open Cup three times, most recently in 2018. The Union won their first playoff match in 2019—their fourth post-season appearance—and advanced to the Conference Semifinals, where they lost to Atlanta United FC four days later. The club earned the Supporters' Shield, their first trophy, during the shortened 2020 season and opened the playoffs against the eighth-seed New England Revolution, who defeated the Union in an upset.

The club finished second in the Eastern Conference in 2021 and advanced to the Conference Finals, where they were eliminated by eventual champions New York City FC after 11 players were ruled ineligible to play due to COVID-19 quarantine restrictions. The Union retained most of their roster and steadily added more attacking talent through the 2021 season and subsequent off-season, signing midfielder Dániel Gazdag from Budapest Honvéd in Hungary, forward Julián Carranza on loan from Inter Miami CF, and Mikael Uhre from Brøndby IF in Denmark; Uhre's transfer set a club record with its $2.8 million fee. The team also traded away leading goalscorer Kacper Przybylko and midfielder Jamiro Monteiro to other MLS clubs and sought lower-priced players from overseas to supplement homegrown prospects as replacements.

The Union opened the 2022 season with a draw against Minnesota United FC and five consecutive wins, mostly against Eastern Conference opponents, to take the lead in league standings. Their success was attributed to a strong defense and performances from goalkeeper Andre Blake to compensate for a lack of goals scored. Following a loss to Toronto FC that snapped the winning streak, the club drew seven of eight matches as the team struggled to retain leads. The Union remained first in the East and broke the streak with a 2–1 win against New York City FC at home that was decided with a Cory Burke goal in stoppage time.

On July 8, the Union won 7–0 in a match against D.C. United, setting a new club record for margin of victory and tying the league record. The club won their following four matches, including a 6–0 victory against Houston Dynamo FC, which brought them to second in the league standings and three points behind LAFC. The Union sent three players—Blake and defenders Kai Wagner and Jakob Glesnes—to the MLS All-Star Game and finished August with four wins and two losses, including back-to-back 6–0 wins over D.C. United and the Colorado Rapids. The club clinched a playoff berth with their final win in August and remained in contention for the Supporters' Shield until a 4–0 loss to expansion team Charlotte FC in the penultimate week of the season. The Union won 4–0 in their regular season finale against Toronto FC at home and tied LAFC on points in the Supporters' Shield race, but lost on the wins tiebreaker.

The club finished the regular season with the league's best goal difference (+46), the fewest goals conceded in a 34-match season in MLS history (26), and an unbeaten record at home with the most goals scored (49)—tying the league record. For their regular season performances, Jim Curtin won the Sigi Schmid Coach of the Year Award for the second time, Blake earned his third Goalkeeper of the Year Award, and Glesnes was named the Defender of the Year. Four players were named to the MLS Best XI—tied for second-most from a single team in league history—Blake, Glesnes, Wagner, and Gazdag. The club entered the playoffs in the Conference Semifinals, where they hosted fifth-place FC Cincinnati, who were in the playoffs for the first time. Leon Flach scored the lone goal of the match in the 59th minute during a scramble in the penalty area as the Union advanced with a 1–0 win; Blake made six saves to earn his 16th shutout of the year.

The Eastern Conference Final at Subaru Park was a rematch of the previous year's Conference Final with New York City FC, who were missing forward Talles Magno and defender Maxime Chanot. New York City FC took the lead in the 57th minute through a strike from Maximiliano Moralez following a six-player passing sequence that began with goalkeeper Sean Johnson. A free kick from Glesnes in the 65th minute reached Julián Carranza, who scored the equalizer for the Union; Carranza then provided an assist on a goal two minutes later that was finished from close range by Gazdag. The match's final goal was scored in the 76th minute by substitute Cory Burke, who won the ball in midfield and dribbled into the penalty area to provide an assist, but was able to finish a mis-timed clearance from the NYCFC defense. The 3–1 result gave the Union their 11th consecutive home victory, equaling the longest streak in MLS history, and an undefeated record at home in 2022.

Summary of results
Note: In all results below, the score of the finalist is given first (H: home; A: away).

Venue

MLS Cup 2022 was hosted on November 5, 2022, by LAFC at their home stadium, Banc of California Stadium in Los Angeles, California. The soccer-specific stadium seats 22,000 people and opened in April 2018. Tickets were released days before the match and sold out immediately; they ranged from $450 to $10,000 on secondary markets. To promote the match, several Los Angeles landmarks (including City Hall and Union Station) were lit in gold lights and the club's flag was raised at Venice Beach and aboard the USS Iowa. Local restaurant chain Pink's Hot Dogs also offered a "LAFC Dog" during the week leading up to the final.

Due to a home USC Trojans football game later in the day at the neighboring Los Angeles Memorial Coliseum which also happened to be the homecoming game, LAFC announced that there would be no parking spaces reserved for MLS Cup attendees at the stadium. The club encouraged the use of Metro light rail and bus options, offering free TAP Cards for attendees, as well as a shuttle bus from Dodger Stadium with free parking. LAFC opened up the stadium at 10:30 a.m. to encourage early arrivals and sold half-price concessions during the first hour.

The Union organized hotel-and-ticket packages for 460 fans to travel to the MLS Cup final in Los Angeles. The club and supporters group Sons of Ben also organized four free watch parties at various venues in the Philadelphia area, including home stadium Subaru Park.

Broadcasting

The match was broadcast in the United States on Fox in English and Univision and TUDN in Spanish with pre-game and post-game coverage. The Canadian broadcast was carried on TSN in English and TVA Sports in French. The English commentary team for Fox included their crew for the FIFA World Cup: play-by-play announcer John Strong, analyst Stuart Holden, and studio host Rodolfo Landeros. For Univision,  and Ramses Sandoval provided play-by-play commentary for alternating halves with analysts  and Marcelo Balboa. Fox used 24 conventional cameras (including four for slow motion replays), a skycam, and a helicopter to cover the match, along with 14 field microphones. The match was also carried by ESPN International in Latin America and Africa; DAZN in Europe and Brazil; Abu Dhabi Sports in the Middle East and North Africa; and Sky Sports in the United Kingdom and Ireland.

Satellite radio coverage was provided by SiriusXM FC with commentators Joe Tolleson, Tony Meola, and Keith Costigan. For the Los Angeles radio market, the match was carried in English by ESPN 710 and in Spanish by KFWB 980. In Philadelphia, Fox Sports Radio had the broadcast in English; the Union also had a radio stream on their website with their local television commentators, JP Dellacamera and Danny Higginbotham.

The U.S. broadcast drew 2.16 million viewers, with 1.49 million on Fox and 668,000 on Univision, and earned a national Nielsen rating of 0.69. It was the second-largest domestic television audience for an MLS Cup final, after the 1997 edition, and increased by 38 percent from the 2021 edition. The match was also the second most-watched club soccer broadcast of 2022 in the United States behind the 2022 UEFA Champions League Final. The MLS Cup final's penalty shootout was watched by approximately 26 percent of all households in the Philadelphia market; the market was also the largest for the Fox broadcast with a rating that averaged 4.78 (347,000 viewers) and peaked at 7.6 (552,000 viewers). The second-highest rating, in the Houston market, was one-third of Philadelphia's and is thought to have been affected by the 2022 World Series broadcast by Fox immediately after the match. The largest market for the Univision broadcast was Los Angeles with a 1.06 rating, which made it the second most-watched LAFC match in their home market after the 2019 Conference Semifinal against the LA Galaxy.

Match

Summary

The MLS Cup final kicked off at 1:05 p.m. under clear skies and in front of 22,384 spectators in attendance, including 500 fans from Philadelphia in the southeast corner. The two teams fielded most of their normal starting lineups, with the exception of midfielder and captain Alejandro Bedoya for the Union, who was recovering from a hip injury but remained available as a substitute. Cherundolo used a 4–3–3 formation and declined to start Chiellini and Bale, while Curtin kept his standard 4–3–1–2 with Jack McGlynn replacing Bedoya in midfield. LAFC wore their home black kit, while the Union chose their blue-and-yellow secondary jersey. Two-time MLS Referee of the Year Ismail Elfath was selected to officiate the MLS Cup, his first for the tournament. Prior to kickoff, the LAFC supporters group 3252 unveiled a tifo depicting Dragon Ball manga character Gogeta, who shares the club's black-and-gold color scheme, and set off smoke flares.

The Union had the majority of possession and chances to start the first half, but were unable to convert them into shots on goal. LAFC won a free kick near the penalty area, awarded for a foul by José Andrés Martínez on Cristian Arango, and used it to take the lead in the 28th minute; Kellyn Acosta's shot was deflected into the goal by Jack McGlynn, who had jumped as part of the wall. LAFC won a free kick from a similar spot in the 39th minute that they used to nearly score, but Diego Palacios's shot from close range was saved by Andre Blake. The Union responded with their own chance in the 43rd minute as Carranza started a counter-attack and fed the ball to Mikael Uhre, who dribbled into the penalty area but lost the ball to Crépeau's block. The teams entered half-time with eight shots, but LAFC held 1–0 lead and the Union had the majority of possession.

The Union had their next chance to score early in the second half, but Uhre's run into the penalty area was stopped by several LAFC defenders. The match was stopped twice within two minutes to check LAFC's Arango and the Union's Olivier Mbaizo for concussion symptoms after two separate head collisions. After a corner kick for the Union was cleared out, Martínez took a shot from outside the penalty area that was hit Dániel Gazdag, who collected the ball and scored to tie the match at 1–1 in the 59th minute. Despite protests from LAFC's defenders, the goal was given as Gazdag was determined to be onside. LAFC midfielder José Cifuentes was shown a yellow card five minutes later for a collision with Blake during a corner kick, which the goalkeeper had jumped to save. In the 83rd minute, a Carlos Vela corner kick was headed in by centerback Jesús David Murillo to give LAFC a 2–1 lead. The Union equalized two minutes later with a header from centerback Jack Elliott off a Kai Wagner free kick that was sent into the penalty area. During the celebrations, several Union players were struck by cups of beer thrown from the stands. The hosts attempted to retake the lead with a set piece during stoppage time, but a header by defender Sebastien Ibeagha was saved by Blake shortly before the end of regulation time.

The match entered extra time and LAFC had a chance to score after a loose ball that was misplayed by Blake but out of range for Denis Bouanga. Julián Carranza had a chance to score for the Union shortly before extra time's half-time, but was unable to head the cross from Kai Wagner into the goal. In the 110th minute, a long overhead ball from Mbaizo was misplayed by Murillo, whose backpass to his own goal was collected by Union substitute Cory Burke, who collided with Crépeau as he ran from the penalty area. Crépeau broke his right leg during the challenge and left the stadium in an ambulance, while Burke was substituted a few minutes later. Elfath initially showed a yellow card to Crépeau but sent him off in the 116th minute—while leaving the pitch for his injury—after consulting with the video assistant referee. LAFC played the rest of the match with 10 players and substituted Kwadwo Opoku for back-up goalkeeper John McCarthy, a former Union player and Philadelphia-area native who had only played once in the 2022 regular season.

Elfath awarded nine minutes of stoppage time due to the pauses in play to evaluate and treat Crépeau and Burke, as well as other interruptions. The Union pressed for a third goal and found one in the 124th minute through a corner kick by Wagner that was cleared and returned to the penalty area several times. Elliott and several celebrating players were showered with beer cans and cups thrown by the stands once again. LAFC found an equalizer in the 128th minute through a Diego Palacios cross that was headed in by Gareth Bale, who had entered during extra time as a substitute and out-jumped Elliott for the ball. It was the latest goal scored in MLS Cup Playoffs history, replacing Elliott's scored four minutes earlier, and tied the match at 3–3 through the end of extra time.

The 2022 final was the sixth MLS Cup to be decided by a penalty shootout, which had also been used in the previous year. LAFC's first penalty was taken by Cristian Tello and saved by Blake, but a slip during Gazdag's run resulted in a miss that kept the shootout scoreless. Bouanga scored his second-round penalty, while Martínez's attempt was saved by McCarthy after reading his stutter step. A successful conversion by Ryan Hollingshead, who sent Blake the wrong way, was followed by a McCarthy save on Kai Wagner to set up a decider in the fourth round. Ilie Sánchez's shot towards the bottom right corner went under Blake during his attempt at a diving save, ending the shootout at 3–0 for LAFC.

Details

Post-match

LAFC became the fifteenth team to win the MLS Cup and the ninth new champion since 2013; they were also the seventh host to win the MLS Cup in the decade since the neutral-site format was abolished. The club were the eighth to win a domestic double—composed of the Supporters' Shield and MLS Cup—and the first since Toronto FC in 2017. The match was attended by several of the club's celebrity owners, including Magic Johnson, Mia Hamm, and Will Ferrell, as well as other figures in the entertainment industry. LAFC celebrated their MLS Cup title with 5,000 fans at Banc of California Stadium's Christmas Tree Lane the following day in lieu of a traditional parade.

Steve Cherundolo became the second head coach to win the MLS Cup in his first year in the league, following Piotr Nowak with D.C. United in 2004. McCarthy, the first substitute goalkeeper to win the league championship, was named the MLS Cup most valuable player for his penalty saves and maintaining the first shutout in a MLS Cup shootout. He said he was "absolutely devastated" for Crépeau and called the tackle on Burke the "play of the game"; Crépeau himself celebrated from the ambulance—and later the hospital—through a video call to his teammates on the field and coach during the post-match press conference. The following day, LAFC announced that Crépeau would be unable to join the Canadian national team at the 2022 FIFA World Cup due to his injury. Gareth Bale became the first player to score in the finals of the MLS Cup and UEFA Champions League, stating after the match that he "seem[ed] to have a knack of doing that". He then retired from professional soccer in January 2023.

The match was hailed as an "instant classic" and "the most thrilling" in the history of the MLS Cup; other commentators also ranked it as the among the best in the league's history. The 2022 final is tied as the highest-scoring MLS Cup final alongside the 2003 final, which was also the last time two top-seeded teams were finalists; it marked the first time that both finalists had scored three goals. Commissioner Don Garber said it "was Major League Soccer at its very best", while Carlos Vela labeled the finish as "a Hollywood movie". Union coach Jim Curtin described the match as "chaotic" and "what a final should be", but called the loss "heartbreaking". He also stated that he "lived through the 130 minutes and aged probably five, six years" and complimented his players on their accomplishment in getting to the final. The Philadelphia Phillies of Major League Baseball lost the World Series later in the day, making Philadelphia the first U.S. city to lose two major league sports championships on the same day.

Both finalists had already qualified for the 2023 CONCACAF Champions League with their regular season performances. The leftover slot was awarded to Austin FC, the next best eligible team from the United States in the 2022 regular season standings. As MLS Cup champions, LAFC also qualified directly for the knockout stage of the 2023 Leagues Cup.

References

2022
2022 Major League Soccer season
November 2022 sports events in the United States
Los Angeles FC matches
Philadelphia Union matches
2022 in sports in California
Association football penalty shoot-outs